Charzeh Khun (also Romanized as Charzeh Khūn) is a village in Ujan-e Gharbi Rural District of the Central District of Bostanabad County, East Azerbaijan province, Iran. At the 2006 census, its population was 1,548 in 334 households. The following census in 2011 counted 1,709 people in 428 households. The latest census in 2016 showed a population of 1,679 people in 463 households; it was the largest village in its rural district.

References 

Bostanabad County

Populated places in East Azerbaijan Province

Populated places in Bostanabad County